12/10 may refer to:
December 10 (month-day date notation)
October 12 (day-month date notation)
12 shillings and 10 pence in UK predecimal currency